Daintree Reef is a reef system in the Coral Sea, Queensland. The system is composed of three reefs: Daintree Reef North, Central and South.

See also
 List of reefs

References

Coral reefs
Reefs of Australia
Tourist attractions in Queensland
Coastline of Queensland
Reefs of the Pacific Ocean